Thomas Ramsay (1877–1956) was a Scottish politician.

Thomas Ramsay or Tom Ramsay may also refer to:

Sir Thomas Ramsay (businessman) (born 1907), son of William Ramsay, founder of Kiwi shoe polish
Thomas Ramsay (Scottish Baptist) (1867–1934), Scottish lay pastor and businessman
Thomas Donald Ramsay (born 1939), representative for the Texas House of Representatives

Tom Ramsay (curler) (1901–1995), Canadian curler
Tom Ramsay (Neighbours), fictional character in the Australian TV series Neighbours

See also
Thomas Ramsay Science and Humanities Fellowship
Thomas Ramsey (disambiguation)